State Route 161 (SR 161) is a state highway in Clark County, Nevada. It is known as Goodsprings Road, connecting the town of Goodsprings to Interstate 15 at Jean. The route was part of State Route 53 prior to 1976.

Route description

The route begins at the intersection of Esmeralda Street and Spring Street in Goodsprings. It runs east along Spring Street, then exits the town and heads southeastward, intersecting Sandy Valley Road in the Mojave Desert. The road continues southeastward for about  before entering Jean. SR 161 ends in Jean at an interchange with Interstate 15.

History

A connection between Goodsprings and U.S. Route 91 (and SR 6) at Jean first appeared on official Nevada state maps in 1933. At that time, it was an unimproved county road. By 1935, that road was incorporated into State Route 53, which connected Jean to Goodsprings before curving southwest towards the California state line. By 1941, the first  of the SR 53 reaching Goodsprings was paved, with the remaining  in to Sandy Valley and on to California remained unimproved.

SR 53 remained unchanged until the 1976 renumbering of Nevada's state highway system that was authorized on July 1, 1976. In that process, the paved portion of the highway between Jean and Goodsprings was renumbered to State Route 161. This change was first seen on the 1978–1979 edition of the official state map The remaining section of SR 53 to Sandy Valley continued to be shown on the state map, but was dropped from the state system by 1982. Sandy Valley is now reachable via the Sandy Valley road turnoff from SR 161, prior to entering Goodsprings.

Major intersections

References

161
161
Streets in the Las Vegas Valley